Konstantin Dimitrov Georgiev (26 October 1931 – 25 December 2016) was a Bulgarian basketball player. He competed in the men's tournament at the 1952 Summer Olympics.

References

External links
 

1931 births
2016 deaths
Bulgarian men's basketball players
Olympic basketball players of Bulgaria
Basketball players at the 1952 Summer Olympics
Place of birth missing
Sportspeople from Pleven